The Townsville Ring Road is a motorway in Townsville, Queensland, Australia. The road has been constructed as the new A1/M1 (Bruce Highway) route that bypasses the inner metro area of Townsville. The road was built in 4 stages with the first stage, the Douglas Arterial Road, opened in April 2005 and the most recent section opened in 2017. Stage 5 is commencing construction in late 2020 which includes duplicating the remaining 6-kilometre 2-lane undivided section between Vickers Bridge and Shaw Road in Thuringowa. There is no toll for the use of this motorway.

History
The Townsville Ring Road was built in 4 stages:

Stage 1
Stage 1 was the Douglas Arterial Road, which opened April 2005. It was in initially a two-lane single carriageway, prior to 2012.

Stage 2 & 3
The next stages, the Condon Bypass and Shaws Road extension opened in 2009. Surveying commenced on 24 October 2006 for the Hervey Range Road Interchange. Construction of the interchange began April 2007. Upon completion, the road was designated as part of Highway 1, with the route number A1, with plans to eventually be numbered M1 following duplication of the entire project (including construction of the Bohle plains Extension).

Stage 4
Stage 4 was the Bohle Plains Extension, which opened December 2016.

Stage 5
Stage 5 includes duplication between Vickers Bridge and Shaw Road in Thuringowa. Construction is expected to commence in mid 2021 and be completed in early 2023 at a cost of $230 million. The principal contractor for the project is Georgiou Group.

Route description
The Douglas Arterial Road is also known as the Ring Road, as part of the broader ring road project, or the Douglas Motorway. The  section has two dual carriageways separated by concrete barriers built in 2012. It also features a six-lane, 250 metre bridge across the Ross River and Riverway Drive which was constructed upstream of the existing Vickers Bridge (named after the famous Vickers family), along with a two-lane bridge over Discovery Drive and  University Creek. There are also grade-separated interchanges at University Road and Angus Smith Drive.

As with the existing Douglas section, the arterial comprises two 3.5 metre-wide lanes with two 2 metre-wide shoulders (a total of 11 metres wide).  It is built as a motorway with a speed limit of 100 km/h and the usual restrictions (no mopeds, animals, farm vehicles, cyclists or pedestrians) will apply. New exits and entry ramps were constructed on the Riverside Boulevard overpass connecting the suburb to the Arterial.

The Townsville Ring Road, beyond the Douglas Arterial, was also built as a single carriageway.

Major intersections

See also

Freeways in Australia
Freeways in Townsville

References

External links
 Ring Road Project site
Douglas duplication reference

Roads in Queensland
Transport in Townsville
Ring roads in Australia